Dr. Ninian Mogan Lourdenadin KCMG KBE is a British-Malaysian businessman, investor, and doctor. He is the principal shareholder and CEO of MBf Holdings, a Malaysian services conglomerate operating in Malaysia, Fiji, Papua New Guinea, and Australia.

According to Forbes, he is the 25th richest person in Malaysia, with a net worth of $900 million.

Between 2004 and 2014 he donated $15 million to education and children's health charities as well as to Hindu temples in Malaysia, Fiji and Papua New Guinea. In 2014 he was featured in Forbes Asia's list of 48 Heroes of Philanthropy.

Honour

Honour of Malaysia
 Malaysia : Commander of the Order of Loyalty to the Crown of Malaysia (P.S.M.) (2007)

References

External links
Ninian Mogan Lourdenadin on Fortune Malaysia

Living people
Malaysian chief executives
Malaysian medical doctors
Malaysian businesspeople
Malaysian investors
British people of Malaysian descent
Malaysian people of Indian descent
Tamil businesspeople
British businesspeople of Indian descent
Malaysian Christians
Commanders of the Order of Loyalty to the Crown of Malaysia
Year of birth missing (living people)